The 1981 Monaco Grand Prix was a Formula One motor race held at Monaco on 31 May 1981. It was the sixth race of the 1981 Formula One World Championship.

The 76-lap race was won by Canadian driver Gilles Villeneuve, driving a Ferrari. Brazilian Nelson Piquet took pole position in his Brabham-Ford and led until he crashed out on lap 54. Australian Alan Jones finished second in a Williams-Ford, with Frenchman Jacques Laffite third in a Ligier-Matra.

Race
The start of the race was delayed after a fire in the Loews Hotel kitchens, which necessitated the fire service pumping large quantities of water to put the fires out. Water then seeped through the floors of the hotel and into the tunnel, delaying the race for an hour. Nelson Piquet led for much of the race, but crashed out late on. New race leader Alan Jones then suffered a fuel feed problem in the latter stages of the race, allowing Gilles Villeneuve in his Ferrari, to take his first victory since 1979 as well as becoming the first, and to this day, the only Canadian to win in Monaco. Championship leader Carlos Reutemann retired with gearbox problems, breaking a 15-race streak of consistently finishing in the points.

Classification

Pre-qualifying

Qualifying

Race

Championship standings after the race

Drivers' Championship standings

Constructors' Championship standings

References

Monaco Grand Prix
Monaco Grand Prix
Grand Prix